Unhŭng station is a railway station in Unhŭng-ŭp, Unhŭng county, Ryanggang province, North Korea, on the Paektusan Ch'ŏngnyŏn Line of the Korean State Railway.

Originally called Pongdu-ri station (Chosŏn'gŭl: 봉두리역; Hanja: 鳳頭里駅), the station, along with the rest of the Paegam–Pongdu-ri section, was opened by the Government Railways of Chosen (朝鮮総督府鉄道) on 1 September 1935. It received its current name after the establishment of the DPRK.

On 9 October 2006 an underground nuclear test was conducted at P'unggye-ri in Kilju County, causing the closure of the line for 3-4 months.

Iron sulphide is the main commodity shipped from Unhŭng.

References

Railway stations in North Korea